The Industrial (Second) functional constituency is a functional constituency in the elections for the Legislative Council of Hong Kong first created in 1985. It was one of the 12 original functional constituency seats created for the first ever Legislative Council election in 1985 and is corresponding to the Industrial (Second) Subsector in the Election Committee. The constituency is composed of corporate members of the Chinese Manufacturers' Association of Hong Kong that are entitled to vote at general meetings of the Association. In 2021, there were 592 corporate electors in the constituency.

Return members

Electoral results

2020s

2010s

2000s

1990s

1980s

References

Constituencies of Hong Kong
Constituencies of Hong Kong Legislative Council
Functional constituencies (Hong Kong)
1985 establishments in Hong Kong
Constituencies established in 1985